The Calgary Flames are a professional ice hockey team based in Calgary, Alberta, Canada. They are members of the Northwest Division of the Western Conference in the National Hockey League (NHL). The Flames arrived in Calgary in 1980 after transferring from the city of Atlanta, Georgia, where they were known as the Atlanta Flames from their founding in 1972 until relocation.

The Flames have won numerous team and individual awards and honours since moving to Calgary. The team has captured the Clarence S. Campbell Bowl as Western Conference champion in 1986, 1989 and 2004, winning the Stanley Cup in 1989. Jarome Iginla is the team's most decorated player, with two Rocket Richard Trophy wins, an Art Ross Trophy, and a Lester B. Pearson Award along with two selections to the NHL first All-Star team, one to the second All-Star team, and a selection to the All-Rookie Team in 1997. Theoren Fleury, Al MacInnis and Jarome Iginla each played in six National Hockey League All-Star Games, the most in Flames history.

Three players have had their numbers retired by the Flames. Lanny McDonald's number 9 was removed from circulation in 1989, while Mike Vernon's number 30 was retired in 2007. Jarome Iginla's number 12 was retired in 2019. Additionally, Al MacInnis' number 2 was honoured in 2012 and Joe Nieuwendyk's number 25 in 2014.  McDonald is also one of several Hockey Hall of Famers who were associated with the Flames. Joe Mullen and Al MacInnis played several seasons in Calgary as part of Hall of Fame careers, while general manager Cliff Fletcher, coach Bob Johnson and owner Harley Hotchkiss have each been inducted as builders.

The Flames have three internal team awards. The Molson Cup is awarded to the player who earns the most three-star selections throughout the season. The Ralph T. Scurfield Humanitarian Award, given for dedication and community service, and J. R. "Bud" McCaig Award, given for respect and courtesy, are presented towards the end of each season.

League awards

Team trophies

The Calgary Flames have won the Western (previously the Campbell) Conference three times in franchise history, winning the Stanley Cup once, in 1989. They have twice won the Presidents' Trophy as the top team in the NHL during the regular season.

Individual awards
Jarome Iginla is one of the Flames' most decorated players. In 2001–02, Iginla led the NHL with 52-goals and 96-points, earning him the Rocket Richard and Art Ross Trophies. Iginla also was named the most valuable player as selected by his peers, and a first team all-star. Iginla won his second Richard Trophy when he tied for the league lead in goals with 41 in 2003–04.

Lanny McDonald was the first winner of the King Clancy Memorial Trophy in 1987–88, earning the award in recognition of his charity work in both Toronto and Calgary. Sergei Makarov was a controversial winner of the Calder Memorial Trophy in 1989–90. He won the rookie of the year award at the age of 31 after spending 13 seasons in the Soviet League. As a result, the NHL changed the rules for the award, restricting it to players aged 26 or younger.

 denotes player won the award as a member of the Atlanta Flames

All-Stars

NHL first and second team All-Stars
The NHL first and second team All-Stars are the top players at each position as voted on by the Professional Hockey Writers' Association.

NHL All-Rookie Team
The NHL All-Rookie Team consists of the top rookies at each position as voted on by the Professional Hockey Writers' Association.

All-Star Game selections
The National Hockey League All-Star Game is a mid-season exhibition game held annually between many of the top players of each season. Thirty-two All-Star Games have been held since the Flames arrived in Calgary, with at least one player representing the Flames in each year but 2001. The All-Star game has not been held in various years: 1995 and 2005 as a result of labour stoppages, 2006 and 2010 because of the Winter Olympics, 2021 as a result of the COVID-19 pandemic, and 1987 due to the Rendez-vous '87 series between the NHL and the Soviet national team. The NHL also holds a Young Stars Game for first- and second-year players.

The Flames hosted the 1985 All-Star Game at the Olympic Saddledome. A sell-out crowd saw the Wales Conference defeat the Campbell Conference 6–4, while Al MacInnis and Paul Reinhart represented the Flames at the game. Along with Theoren Fleury and Jarome Iginla, MacInnis played a franchise high six All-Star Games as a member of the Flames.

 Selected by fan vote

Career achievements

Hockey Hall of Fame

Several members of the Flames organization have been honoured by the Hockey Hall of Fame during the team's history in Calgary. Lanny McDonald was the first Flame player inducted, gaining election in 1992. McDonald recorded 215 goals in 492 games for the Flames, including a team record 66 goals in 1982–83. He was joined in 2000 by a fellow member of the 1989 Stanley Cup championship team, Joe Mullen. Mullen spent five seasons with the Flames, recording 388 points and capturing two Lady Byng Trophies. Grant Fuhr, elected in 2003, became the third former Flames player to enter the Hall. Fuhr played only one season in Calgary; however, he recorded his 400th career win in a Flames uniform, a victory over the Florida Panthers on October 22, 1999. In 2007, Al MacInnis became the fourth former Flame inducted into the Hall, and the third to earn his Hall of Fame credentials primarily as a Flame. MacInnis was a member of the Flames from 1981 until 1994. He is best remembered for his booming slapshot, as well as for winning the Conn Smythe Trophy in 1989 as the most valuable player of playoffs. On June 28, 2011, Joe Nieuwendyk was announced as an inductee to the Hockey Hall of Fame. Nieuwendyk played with the Flames from 1986-1987 until 1994-95. Joe was the team captain from 1991 until he left in '95.

Three members of team management have been inducted in the "Builders" category. Former head coach "Badger" Bob Johnson joined McDonald in the class of 1992, gaining election as a builder. Johnson coached five seasons with the Flames from 1982–87, and his 193 wins remain a team record. Cliff Fletcher was the Flames general manager from the organization's inception in 1972 until 1991–a span of 19 years. During that time, the Flames qualified for the playoffs sixteen consecutive times between 1976 and 1991. Fletcher was inducted in 2004. In 2006, Harley Hotchkiss became the third Flames builder to gain election. Hotchkiss is the team's current governor, and is an original member of the ownership group that purchased and brought the Flames to Calgary in 1980. He has served many years as the chairman of the NHL Board of Directors, during which he played a significant role in the resolution of the 2004–05 lockout.

Flames radio broadcaster Peter Maher was named the recipient of the Foster Hewitt Memorial Award in 2006 for his years of service as the radio play-by-play announcer for the Calgary Flames. Maher has been the radio voice of the Flames since 1981, the team's second season in Calgary. He has called six All-Star Games and four Stanley Cup Finals. Former athletic trainer Bearcat Murray, who served with the Flames from 1980 until 1996 and remains with the organization as a community ambassador, will be inducted into the Hall of Fame by the Professional Hockey Athletic Trainers Society and the Society of Professional Hockey Equipment Managers.

Retired numbers

The Calgary Flames have retired three numbers, and a fourth was retired league-wide. The Flames retired #9 in honour of Lanny McDonald who played right wing for the Flames from 1981 to 1989, winning the Stanley Cup as the Flames captain in his final year. Mike Vernon's #30 is also retired; he was a goaltender with the Flames for fourteen years, from 1982–94 and 2000-02. Also out of circulation is the number 99 which was retired league-wide for Wayne Gretzky on February 6, 2000. Gretzky did not play for the Flames during his 20-year NHL career and no Flames player had ever worn the number 99 prior to its retirement.

"Forever a Flame"
The organization introduced the "Forever a Flame" program in 2012 to replace the retiring of numbers as the highest honour the team can give a former player.  The first player so honoured was Al MacInnis, who was a Flames draft pick in 1981, played 13 seasons in Calgary during which he was an eight-time all-star and winner of the Conn Smythe Trophy as the most valuable player of the 1989 playoffs.  The second player so honoured was Joe Nieuwendyk, whose banner was raised March 7, 2014.

Team awards

J. R. "Bud" McCaig Award
The J. R. "Bud" McCaig Award is a team award given annually to two people, a player and a Flames' staff member, who "best exemplify Mr. McCaig’s enduring virtues of respect, courtesy and compassion for all individuals he encountered both in his professional and everyday life." The award is named in honour of Bud McCaig, a long time owner of the Flames who died in 2005. T. J. Brodie was the player's recipient in 2015–16.

Ralph T. Scurfield Humanitarian Award

The Ralph T. Scurfield Humanitarian Award is a Flames team award given each year to the player who "best exemplifies the qualities of perseverance, determination and leadership on the ice, combined with dedication to community service." It was first awarded in 1987, and is named in honour of one of the Flames original owners, Ralph Thomas Scurfield. Mark Giordano was named the recipient for the 2015–16 season.

Sportsnet 3 Star Cup
The Flames were one of several teams in Canada that awarded the Molson Cup to the player who is named one of a game's top three players, or "three stars", most often over the course of the regular season. Jarome Iginla won the Molson Cup six times, the most in team history. After a six-year absence the award was brought back in 2017 as the Sportsnet 3 Star Cup.

Other awards

Notes

References

Calgary Flames
award winners